André Akkari (born December 28, 1974) is a Brazilian professional poker player. He is a member of Team PokerStars Pro Brazil and is the winner of the 2011 World Series of Poker $1,500 No-Limit Hold'em event.

He is the co-owner of Furia Esports, a Brazilian esports team.

World Series of Poker bracelets 

As of 2015, his total live tournament winnings exceed $1,400,000.

Notes

External links
Official Website
Andre Akkari Interview

Living people
World Series of Poker bracelet winners
Brazilian poker players
1974 births